Lady Cheonanbuwon of the Gyeongju Im clan was the daughter of Im-Eon who became the 11th wife of Taejo of Goryeo. Her father was a Cheonan Governor and two times came to Taejo as his envoy in 927. She bore Taejo 2 sons. Their first son married a daughter of King Jeongjong and Queen Munseong, but had no any issue. This son later murdered in the aftermath of the revenge law enforced by King Gyeongjong, his half nephew. It seems that her 2nd son also didn't have any issue and died young.

References

External links
천안부원부인 on Encykorea .

Year of birth unknown
Year of death unknown
Consorts of Taejo of Goryeo
People from Gyeongju